"Never" is the debut solo single by American singer Keyshia Cole. Co-written by Cole and rapper Eve, it was produced by Errol "E-Poppi" McCalla, Jr. and Ron Fair. The uptempo track samples from the 1981 hit "Never Too Much" by American singer Luther Vandross. Due to the inclusion of the sample, Vandross is also credited as a songwriter. "Never" was first featured on the soundtrack to Kevin Rodney Sullivan's comedy film Barbershop 2: Back in Business (2004) and was later also included on Cole's debut album The Way It Is (2005).

The song was one out of three songs from the Barbershop 2: Back in Business soundtrack that were issued as a single. Released as Cole's debut single through A&M Records in March 2004, "Never" managed to appear on Billboards Hot R&B/Hip-Hop Songs chart, peaking at number seventy-one.

Track listings

Credits and personnel 
Credits adapted from the liner notes of The Way It Is.

 Shannon Braxton – recording engineer
 Keyshia Cole – vocals, writer
 Ron Fair – producer
 Tal Hertzberg – recording engineer
 Eve Jeffers – vocals, writer
 Errol "E-Poppi" McCalla Jr. – producer
 Dave Pensado – mixing engineer
Luther Vandross – writer (sample)

Charts

References

2004 singles
Eve (rapper) songs
Keyshia Cole songs
2004 songs
Barbershop (franchise)
Songs written by Luther Vandross
Songs written by Keyshia Cole
A&M Records singles
Funk songs